Cutias (Portuguese: Município de Cutias do Araguari), formally known as Cutias do Araguari, is a municipality located in the southeast of the state of Amapá in Brazil. The name of the municipality comes from a rodent of the same name, known in English as the agouti. Cutias do Araguari was elevated to the level of municipality on 1 May 1992.

Geography

Cutias is bordered by Pracuúba and Amapá to the north, Macapá to the south, Macapá to the east, and Ferreira Gomes to the west. Cutias is dominated by the Araguari River and its tributaries, which partially submerges the area for nearly half the year. Cutias has a wet, tropical climate; it averages 2,800 mm of rain per year, and has an average humidity of 80%.

Economy
The economy is based on maize and manioc production, raising livestock, and fishing. In 2016, Cutias had the second largest amount of buffalos in Brazil. Cutias do Araguari is the largest exporter of pirarucú (arapaima) in Brazil, an endangered fish noted for its boneless steaks. The common agouti, from which the municipality takes its name, is also used in local cuisine.

Tourism
The town became known during the pororoca craze which attracted surfers to the Araguari River which has large tidal bores.

References

External links 
 Official website (in Portuguese)
 

Municipalities in Amapá
Populated places in Amapá